Chebo or Chabo is an ethnic group of the south West shewa zone  and West Shewa Zone of the Oromia Region of south-west Ethiopia. The Chebo speak the Oromo language but originate from a  Gurage ethnic groups. Their religion is Ethiopia Orthodox Christianity, 
the livelihood of the Chebo-Inchini area of is described as enset (Ethiopian banana), barley, and cattle.

Name
One possible explanation of the name Chebo is from the Chebe plant, Croton gratissimus (lavender croton), which is normally burned during Meskel damera celebrations.

Another possible explanation is the name of the area where the Chebo people live. Parts of the south west Shewa Zone had been incorporated in Chebo and Gurage districts in the Shewa province, as it was called prior to 1995.

Notable Chebo
 Esteban Mitsou Errandonea

Notes

References
 Kloos, Helmut, A. Etea, A. Degefa, H. Aga, B. Solomon, K. Abera, A. Abegaz, G. Belemo. 1987. Illness and health behaviour in Addis Ababa and rural central Ethiopia. Soc. Sci. Med., 25 (9): 1003-1019.
 Kloos, Helmut, A. Adugna. 1989. Settler migration during the 1984/85 resettlement programme in Ethiopia. Geo Journal, 19.2: 113-127.
 Tadele, Desalegn, E. Lulekal, D. Damtie, A. Assefa. 2014. Floristic diversity and regeneration status of woody plants in Zengena Forest, a remnant montane forest patch in northwestern Ethiopia. Journral of Forestry Research, 25 (2): 329-336.

External links
Vernonia leopoldi
Chebo and Gurage Awraja

Ethnic groups in Ethiopia